Congo Premier League is the top division of the Congolese Football Federation, in the Republic of the Congo. It was created in 1961.
The official name is Championnat National MTN for sponsorship reasons.

Between 1961 and 1977 the championship was decided in a 3-team tournament between the regional champions of Brazzaville, Pointe-Noire, and Niari. From 1978 to 1993, a nationwide league with 10 to 14 teams was played. From 1994 to 2008, the FECOFOOT reverted to a national play-off after the regional tournaments, with additional entries for the stronger leagues (Brazzaville, Pointe-Noire). In 2009, a nationwide league was reformed with 18 teams.

Championnat National MTN Clubs - 2016
AC Léopards (Dolisie)
AS Cheminots (Pointe-Noire)
AS Kondzo (Brazzaville)
AS Ponténégrine (Pointe-Noire)
CARA Brazzaville (Brazzaville)
CS La Mancha (Pointe-Noire)
CSM Diables Noirs (Brazzaville)
Étoile du Congo (Brazzaville)
Inter Club (Brazzaville)
Jeunes Fauves (Dolisie)
JS Poto-Poto (Brazzaville)
JS Talangaï (Brazzaville)
Kimbonguila Kinkala
Munisport (Pointe-Noire)
Nico-Nicoyé (Pointe-Noire)
Patronage Sainte-Anne (Brazzaville)
Pigeon Vert
Saint Michel d'Ouenzé (Brazzaville)
Tongo FC Jambon (Brazzaville)
V. Club Mokanda (Pointe-Noire)

Previous winners

1961 : CSM Diables Noirs (Brazzaville) bt AS Cheminots (Pointe-Noire) 
1962–66 : no championship
1967 : Étoile du Congo (Brazzaville)
1968 : Patronage Sainte-Anne (Brazzaville)
1969 : CARA Brazzaville (Brazzaville)
1970–71 : Victoria Club Mokanda (Pointe-Noire)
1972 : not held
1973 : CARA Brazzaville (Brazzaville)
1974 : not held
1975 : CARA Brazzaville (Brazzaville)
1976 : CSM Diables Noirs (Brazzaville) bt Vita Club Mokanda (Pointe-Noire)
1977–78 : Étoile du Congo (Brazzaville)
1979 : Étoile du Congo (Brazzaville)
1980 : Étoile du Congo (Brazzaville)
1981–82 : CARA Brazzaville (Brazzaville)
1982–83 : Kotoko MFOA (Brazzaville)
1983 : Étoile du Congo (Brazzaville)
1984 : CARA Brazzaville (Brazzaville)
1985 : Étoile du Congo (Brazzaville)
1986 : Patronage Sainte-Anne (Brazzaville)
1987 : Étoile du Congo (Brazzaville)
1988 : Inter Club (Brazzaville)
1989 : Étoile du Congo (Brazzaville)
1990 : Inter Club (Brazzaville)
1991 : CSM Diables Noirs (Brazzaville)
1992–93 : not held
1994 : championship abandoned
1995 : AS Cheminots (Pointe-Noire) 1-0 Patronage Sainte-Anne (Brazzaville)
1996 : Munisport (Pointe-Noire)
1997 : Munisport (Pointe-Noire) bt Union Sport (Brazzaville)
1998 : Vita Club Mokanda (Pointe-Noire) 1-0 Étoile du Congo (Brazzaville)
1999 : not held
2000 : Étoile du Congo (Brazzaville)
2001 : Étoile du Congo (Brazzaville) 1-0 CS La Mancha (Pointe-Noire)
2002 : AS Police (Brazzaville) 2-1 Étoile du Congo (Brazzaville)
2003 : Saint Michel d'Ouenzé (Brazzaville)  0-0 CS La Mancha (Pointe-Noire) (4-3 on pens)
2004 : CSM Diables Noirs (Brazzaville) 2-1 AS Police (Brazzaville)
2005 : AS Police (Brazzaville)
2006 : Étoile du Congo (Brazzaville) 1-0 CS La Mancha (Pointe-Noire)
2007 : CSM Diables Noirs (Brazzaville) 2-0 AS Ponténégrine (Pointe-Noire)
2008 : CARA Brazzaville (Brazzaville) 2-1 FC Bilombé (Pointe-Noire)
2009 : CSM Diables Noirs (Brazzaville)
2010 : Saint Michel d'Ouenzé (Brazzaville) 3-2 AC Léopards (Dolisie)
2011 : CSM Diables Noirs (Brazzaville) 2-0 AC Léopards (Dolisie)
2012 : AC Léopards (Dolisie) 1-1 CSM Diables Noirs (Brazzaville) (aet; 4-2 on pens)
2013 : AC Léopards (Dolisie)
2014 : abandoned due to financial problems
2015 : abandoned due to club boycotts
2016 : AC Léopards (Dolisie)
2017 : AC Léopards (Dolisie)
2018 : AS Otohô (Oyo)
2018–2019 : AS Otohô (Oyo)
2019–2020 : AS Otohô (Oyo)
2021 : AS Otohô (Oyo)
2021–2022 : AS Otohô (Oyo)

Performance By Club

Topscorers

References

External links
Football for the Peoples. Congo
League at FIFA.com
RSSSF competition history

Football leagues in the Republic of the Congo
Congo

it:Campionato congolese di calcio